Redbait may refer to:
The fish species Emmelichthys nitidus
Pyura stolonifera, an ascidian often used as bait by anglers
Red-baiting

Animal common name disambiguation pages